Müşfik Galip Kenter (9 September 1932 – 15 August 2012) was a Turkish theatre and voice actor. He was of English descent from his maternal side.

On 14 August 2012, local news outlets reported that Kenter had been admitted to the intensive care unit at F.N. Hospital and diagnosed with pulmonary infection due to lung cancer. On the same day, the assertions were denied by Kenter's wife, Kadriye Kenter (née Demirel), who said that he was having routine checkups.

He died on 15 August 2012 at the age of 79 in Istanbul. In further reports, it was revealed that he had been diagnosed with cancer in early June 2012. This followed the death of his disabled son Mahmut, a son from his first marriage with Esin Şerbetçi, who died at the age of 46 on 27 May 2012 due to respiratory problems.

Filmography

References

External links
 

1932 births
2012 deaths
Male actors from Istanbul
Turkish male stage actors
State Artists of Turkey
Turkish people of English descent
Turkish expatriates in the United Kingdom
Ankara State Conservatory alumni
Deaths from lung cancer in Turkey
Best Supporting Actor Golden Orange Award winners
Turkish male voice actors
Turkish male film actors